Varzaqan (also Romanized as Varzeqān and Warzagan; formerly, Karzigan (Persian: كَرزيگَن), also Romanized as Kārzigān and Karzygan) is a city in the Central District of Varzaqan County, East Azerbaijan province, Iran, and serves as capital of the county. At the 2006 census, its population was 3,549 in 930 households. The following census in 2011 counted 5,385 people in 1,392 households. The latest census in 2016 showed a population of 5,348 people in 1,401 households. The city is famous for the Sungun copper mine, 25 km from the city centre, which is estimated to have 3 percent of the known copper reserves in the world.

Historical landmark
The cuneiform inscription in the village of Saqandel is the most famous historical monument in the region.

Earthquakes

The area is subject to earthquakes, and in 2012 a number of people were killed when an earthquake doublet (magnitude 6.4 and 6.3) struck on the afternoon of 11 August.

Economy
Farming is the predominant occupation in the rural areas.  The area produces apple, pear, cherry, walnut and apricot fruit. Recently  spruce trees have been planted as the start of a forestry industry. Cold water fish farming has been started.

Varzeqan is a mining centre for base metal mining, as well as gold. The Sungun copper mine is now the largest copper mine in northwestern Iran. The deposit itself is one of the largest copper deposits in the world.  There are nearby gold mines at Shrfabad, Hyzjan, Tshkhsrv, Astrgan, Andryan and Myvhrvd.

References 

Varzaqan County

Cities in East Azerbaijan Province

Populated places in East Azerbaijan Province

Populated places in Varzaqan County